Iftach Spector (born 20 October 1940) is a retired Israeli brigadier general, a former fighter pilot and commander of the airbases at Tel Nof and Ramat David. He serves on the Israel Advisory Council of the Israel Policy Forum.

Biography 
Spector was born in Petah Tikva, in what was then Mandate Palestine, in 1940. His parents were both part of the Palmach, the elite strike force of the Haganah. His father, Zvi Spector, was the commander of Operation Boatswain, a failed 1941 Palmach mission in Lebanon that resulted in the deaths of all participants, and his mother, Shoshana Spector, was among the founding members of the Palmach and served as its adjutant officer. Spector grew up on kibbutz Givat Brenner and kibbutz Hulata.

Spector saw action in the Six-Day War, and was one of the pilots involved in the USS Liberty incident. He took part in Operation Rimon 20, an air battle between Israel and the Soviet Union during the War of Attrition, later fought in the Yom Kippur War, and participated in Operation Opera, Israel's 1981 bombing of Iraq's nuclear reactor. During his service with the Israeli Air Force, Spector commanded 101 and 107 squadrons and both the air bases at Ramat David and Tel Nof. Spector shot down 12 enemy aircraft, eight while flying the Mirage III and four while flying the F-4 Phantom II.

In 1992 he was awarded the Yitzhak Sadeh Prize for his book A Dream In Blue And Black, a novelized account of a fighter squadron during the Yom Kippur War.

Since 2001, he has been active in the Movement for Disengagement from the Palestinians. In 2003, Spector was one of 27 reserve pilots and former pilots exempt from reserve duty to sign "The pilots' letter" refusing to fly missions against targets in the West Bank and Gaza.

Publications 
 Iftach Spector, Loud and Clear, Minneapolis, Zenith Press, 2009, 426 pp.,   is his personal autobiography.

See also 
 Lists of flying aces in Arab–Israeli wars

References 

Israeli Air Force generals
Israeli flying aces
Israeli Jews
Six-Day War pilots
Yom Kippur War pilots
Living people
1940 births